One Flight Down is an album by pianist Cedar Walton which was recorded in 2006 and released on the Highnote label.

Reception
Allmusic reviewed the album stating "Cedar Walton shows no signs of slowing down at age 72, demonstrating both experience and enthusiasm in this invigorating studio session... Highly recommended". All About Jazz observed "His latest release is a typically excellent effort... Straight-ahead jazz piano doesn't get much better than this".

Track listing 
All compositions by Cedar Walton except where noted.
 "One Flight Down" - 5:39    
 "The Rubber Man" - 4:40    
 "Billy Strayhorn Medley: Lush Life" (Billy Strayhorn) - 5:29    
 "Billy Strayhorn Medley: Day Dream" (Strayhorn, Duke Ellington, John La Touche) - 4:39    
 "Billy Strayhorn Medley: Raincheck" (Strayhorn) - 4:09    
 "Seven Minds" (Sam Jones) - 7:04    
 "Time After Time" (Jule Styne, Sammy Cahn) - 7:52    
 "Hammer Head" (Wayne Shorter) - 6:36    
 "Little Sunflower" (Freddie Hubbard) - 9:45

Personnel

Musicians
Cedar Walton - piano
Vincent Herring - tenor saxophone (tracks 1 & 2)
David Williams - bass
Joe Farnsworth - drums

Production
Don Sickler - producer
Rudy Van Gelder - engineer

References 

Cedar Walton albums
2006 albums
HighNote Records albums
Albums recorded at Van Gelder Studio